Podișu may refer to several villages in Romania:

 Podișu, a village in Bălțați Commune, Iași County
 Podișu, a village in Ileanda Commune, Sălaj County